Dymeclin is a protein that in humans is encoded by the DYM gene.

This gene encodes a protein which is necessary for normal skeletal development and brain function. Mutations in this gene are associated with two types of recessive osteochondrodysplasia, Dyggve-Melchior-Clausen (DMC) dysplasia and Smith-McCort (SMC) dysplasia, which involve both skeletal defects and mental retardation.

References

Further reading